Maior, better known as Maior of Arabia was an Arab sophist and rhetorician during the 3rd century AD. He was a contemporary of the sophists Apsines and Nicagoras, at the time of Roman emperor Philip the Arab (244–249). 

There is little biographical information available about him. Like Nicagoras, Maior might have held an official chair of rhetoric at Athens. According to the Suda, he wrote thirteen books On Issues.

References 

Arabs in the Roman Empire
Roman-era Sophists
3rd-century Romans
3rd-century Arabs
Roman-era Athenian rhetoricians